Valeriu Ivanovich Pogorelov (born 25 June 1967) is a Moldovan former footballer who played as a defender and made eleven appearances for the Moldova national team. He also holds Ukrainian citizenship.

Career
Pogorelov made his debut for Moldova on 16 April 1994 in a friendly match against the United States, which finished as a 1–1 draw. He went on to make eleven appearances, scoring one goal – a spectacular solo effort against Wales in a Euro 96 qualifier in October 1994 – before making his last appearance on 22 April 1998 in a friendly match against Azerbaijan, which finished as a 0–1 loss.

Career statistics

International

International goals

References

External links
 
 
 
 Profile at allplayers.in.ua
 Odesa profile
 Profile at tavriya-history.ru

1967 births
Living people
Moldovan footballers
Moldova international footballers
Ukrainian footballers
Ukrainian people of Moldovan descent
Soviet footballers
Association football defenders
FC Chayka Sevastopol players
SC Tavriya Simferopol players
CS Tiligul-Tiras Tiraspol players
FC Chornomorets Odesa players
FC Tiraspol players
Soviet First League players
Moldovan Super Liga players
Ukrainian Premier League players
Ukrainian First League players
Sportspeople from Odesa Oblast